Volodymyr Pidvirnyi (born January 12, 1990) is a Ukrainian footballer playing with FC Vorkuta in the Canadian Soccer League.

Career 
Pidvirnyi began his career in 2006 with FC Karpaty Lviv, but was loaned to the Ukrainian Second League with FC Karpaty-2 Lviv. In 2010, he played in the Ukrainian First League with FC Enerhetyk Burshtyn, and later played with MFC Mykolaiv, and FC Sambir. In 2014, he played abroad with MFK Vranov nad Topľou in the 3. Liga. He later played in the I liga with Widzew Łódź, and returned to Ukraine to play with SCC Demnya in 2015. In 2016, he returned to Poland to play in the III Liga with Błękitni Raciąż, and Cosmos Nowotaniec.

In 2017, he played overseas in the Canadian Soccer League with FC Vorkuta. He returned in 2019 to play with Vorkuta in the Second Division.

References 

1990 births
Living people
Ukrainian footballers
FC Karpaty-2 Lviv players
FC Enerhetyk Burshtyn players
MFC Mykolaiv players
MFK Vranov nad Topľou players
Widzew Łódź players
FC Continentals players
I liga players
Canadian Soccer League (1998–present) players
Association football defenders
Ukrainian expatriate footballers
Ukrainian expatriate sportspeople in Canada
Expatriate soccer players in Canada
Ukrainian First League players
Ukrainian Second League players
III liga players